Baroness Elizaveta Alexandrovna Demidova (née Stroganova) (3/5 February 1779, Saint Petersburg - April 8 1818, Paris) (Russian - Елизавета Александровна Строганова) was a Russian aristocrat of the Stroganov family.

Life 
In September 1795 in Saint Petersburg, she married Count Nikolai Nikitich Demidov at the age of 16.

Husband Nikolai Demidov became a diplomat and the young couple set up home in Paris, in the Hôtel de Brancas-Lauragais, at the corner of Rue Taitbout and Boulevard des Italiens, becoming strong supporters of Napoleon I of France. 

However, mounting tensions between France and Russia forced Russia to call Nicolas back home in 1805. The couple then set up home in Italy before returning to Russia in 1812 to settle in Moscow.

They were of completely different characters and often lived apart. She was beautiful, light and witty, and her husband more introspective, and so they soon grew bored with each other. After Anatole's birth in 1812, they separated and she returned to live in Paris, where she died in 1818 and was buried in the Père Lachaise Cemetery.

Children 
They had two children, who lived to adult age: 

 Pavel (Paul) Nikolaievich Demidov (1798–1840)

 Anatoly (Anatole) Nikolaievich Demidov (1812–1869)

Two other died as young children:

 Aleksandra Nikolaievna Demidova (19 October 1796 – 24 August 1800)
 Nikolai Nikolaievich Demidov (17 February 1799 – 24 August 1800)

External links

1779 births
1818 deaths
Elizaveta
Burials at Père Lachaise Cemetery
Elizaveta
Emigrants from the Russian Empire to France